Oscilla ligata is a species of sea snail, a marine gastropod mollusk in the family Pyramidellidae, the pyrams and their allies.

Description
The rather thin shell has a rosy-white color and measures 2 mm. The six whorls of the teleoconch have prominent spiral ribs. The outer lip is simple. The columella  has a small transverse plait.

Distribution
This marine species occurs off New South Wales, Australia.

References

 Okutani T., ed. (2000) Marine mollusks in Japan. Tokai University Press. 1173 pp. page(s): 729

Pyramidellidae
Gastropods described in 1877